Glirulus is a genus of dormouse. The only extant species is the Japanese dormouse (Glirulus japonicus) but fossil species indicate that the genus was widespread in Europe in the past.

References

Rodent genera
Mammal genera with one living species
Taxa named by Oldfield Thomas
Dormice